A tool is a device that is required or helpful for the performance of an operation.

Tool may also refer to:

 Magical tools in Wicca, a set of tools used in Wiccan practices
 Tool (band), an American rock band
 Tool, Texas, a US city
 TOOL, the proprietary programming language used by Forte 4GL
 Tool, a derogatory term
 Programming tool, or software development tool, a computer program used to create, debug, maintain, or otherwise support other programs and applications
 Tool around, to aimlessly browse, drive, ride, or walk around with no particular goal, just for the pleasure of it
 Tool steel, a hard and durable type of steel used to make tools
 "Tool", a song by Baboon from Face Down in Turpentine

See also

 Toolz, the Nigerian radio personality Tolu Oniru
 Toon (disambiguation)
 Toos (disambiguation)
 Tulle (netting), a light-weight netting or fabric often used in wedding gowns and ballet tutus